"Local Ad" is the ninth episode of the fourth season of the American comedy television series The Office, and the show's sixty-second episode overall. The episode was written by B. J. Novak, who also acts in the show as Ryan Howard, and directed by Jason Reitman.  It originally aired in the United States on October 25, 2007, on NBC.

After a video team is brought to the office to create a commercial for the company, Michael decides that the employees of the Scranton branch of Dunder Mifflin can create a better commercial. While the majority of the staff work on the commercial, Dwight, still depressed from his break-up with Angela, instead chooses to play a computer game.

Plot
When Michael Scott (Steve Carell) learns that the Scranton branch's participation in a Dunder Mifflin television commercial is limited to five seconds of the staff waving at the camera, he dismisses the advertising consultants sent to the branch, and convinces the company's corporate headquarters to consider an alternative version that he will produce himself.

Michael asks Pam Beesly (Jenna Fischer) to design an animated logo, and she works all night on it. Phyllis Vance's (Phyllis Smith) mission to enlist visiting author Sue Grafton to appear in the ad is unsuccessful. Headed by Darryl Philbin (Craig Robinson), a group of employees write and perform a jingle for the commercial, which Michael ultimately rejects. Andy Bernard (Ed Helms), meanwhile, struggles throughout the day to recall the product name from an advertising jingle that contains the lyrics "Gimme a break. Gimme a break. Break me off a piece of that..."

Dwight Schrute (Rainn Wilson) has largely removed himself to the online virtual world of Second Life. Dwight has created an avatar named Dwight Shelford, also a paper salesman, patterned after his once-perfect real life. He now uses Second Life as an escape from his real-life troubles, even going as far as creating a virtual Second Life, called Second Second Life. Jim Halpert (John Krasinski) also creates his own avatar named Jim Samtanko, a guitar-playing Philadelphia sportswriter, and enters Second Life in order to spy on Dwight.

Dwight has also reluctantly become Andy's confidante regarding his relationship with Angela Martin (Angela Kinsey), Dwight's former girlfriend. Dwight's spirits are lifted when he learns that, during a makeout session with Andy, Angela cried, "Oh, D!". Though, Andy is oblivious to the fact that Angela was referring to Dwight.

After the corporate headquarters rejects Michael's ad, the office employees gather at Poor Richard's Pub to watch the professionally filmed commercial, which Michael refers to as "the world premiere of corporate crapfest." After the commercial, Jim plays Michael's version of the ad on the bar's television set. Over the theme from Chariots of Fire, as Michael narrates "trite catchphrases", a sheet of paper is depicted making a journey around the world, carrying a variety of messages meaningful to the recipients; as Pam's animated whirling sheets of paper coalesce into the company logo to end the ad, the employees as well as the other patrons of the bar show their approval.

The episode ends with Andy doing an interview, still trying to recall the product name from the jingle. On the basis that it has to rhyme, he incorrectly concludes that it promotes Fancy Feast cat food.

Production
"Local Ad" was the seventh episode of the series written by B. J. Novak, who also acts in the show as Ryan Howard, and the first episode of the series directed by Jason Reitman, who directed the films Juno and Thank You for Smoking. When speaking about his directorial experience with The Office, Reitman stated that "Anyhow, the whole experience was awesome. They’re all geniuses over there. I didn’t have to contribute much at the end of the day because they’re all so on their game."  He also stated that "Weird moment of production design surprise – There's a three ring binder on Creed's desk with the logo from the Academy of Tobacco Studies that we created for [Thank You For] Smoking. I have no idea how it got there and neither does he."  B.J. Novak's brother Jesse, a musician, contributed in writing the song that some of the characters sing in the episode.

The Second Life scenes in "Local Ad" were produced by Clear Ink of Berkeley, CA, using existing locations within Second Life as well as virtual sets created for the episode. In a study made by IAG Research, the appearance of Second Life in "Local Ad" was rated eighth in the top ten most effective product placements of 2007. The Office was the only non-reality show to make the list, and Second Life was the only product on the list that did not pay for its placement. In a deleted scene, Toby has an idea for the ad: film it in slow-motion so that it will stand out when the viewer uses his TiVo or other DVR to speed past it. The staff loves the idea, but Michael hates it and won't consider it, even though Toby reveals he formerly worked in advertising for three years.

Reception
"Local Ad" received a 5.2 Nielsen rating and an 8% Share. The episode was watched by an estimate audience of 8.98 million viewers and achieved a 4.7/11 in the key adults 18–49 demographic.  This means that 4.1 percent of all people aged 18–49 viewed the episode, and eleven percent of all people watching television at the time viewed the episode.

"Local Ad" received generally favorable reviews from critics.  Travis Fickett of IGN gave the episode a favorable review, saying "This episode is a prime example of how The Office is able to do broad comedy while at the same time treating its characters as real people."  Fickett went on to praise the acting of Rainn Wilson as a depressed Dwight, as well as the story's twist.  Fickett stated that "A great twist here is that we think we're watching Michael pilot a sinking ship as usual, but in fact – the ad is quite good. There's some clever stuff in there, albeit some of it not exactly professional in its production, but Michael doesn't do such a bad job."  Like Fickett, Christine Fenno of Entertainment Weekly gave the episode a favorable review.  Fenno said that "The premise of this episode, 'Local Ad' — the Scranton staffers shoot a commercial — was strong, and allowed almost every ensemble member to shine."  Fenno also praised the acting work of Ed Helms as Andy, as well as Steve Carell as Michael.  Oscar Dahl, a Senior Writer for BuddyTV, praised the episode, but also felt that the episode's thirty-minute length created a stark contrast to the previous four episodes' hour-long run, saying "tonight's episode felt short.  Really short."

For his work on this episode, B. J. Novak was nominated for a Writers Guild of America Award for Best Screenplay – Episodic Comedy, but ultimately failed to win, losing to another episode of The Office, "The Job."

References

External links
"Local Ad" at NBC.com

The Office (American season 4) episodes
2007 American television episodes
Second Life
Television episodes about advertising